Carl Abraham Zimring is an American historian and professor at the Pratt Institute, known for his work on discard studies. With William Rathje, he edited The Encyclopedia of Consumption and Waste: The Social Science of Garbage (Sage Publications, 2012). His books include Cash for Your Trash: Scrap Recycling in America (Rutgers University Press, 2005), Clean and White: A History of Environmental Racism (New York: New York University Press, 2015), and Aluminum Upcycled: Sustainable Design in Historical Perspective (Johns Hopkins University Press, 2017).

External links 
 Carl A. Zimring's Home Page.
 Blog.

21st-century American historians
Living people
Year of birth missing (living people)
21st-century American male writers
Environmental historians